Erminio Azzaro (born 12 January 1948) is a retired Italian high jumper who won a bronze medal at the 1969 European Championships.

Biography
Domestically he won the national high jump title six times: four times outdoors (1966, 1969–71) and twice indoors (1970–71).

His wife Sara Simeoni and son Roberto are also international high jumpers.

National titles
Italian Athletics Championships
High jump: 1966, 1969, 1970, 1971 (4)
Italian Athletics Indoor Championships
High jump: 1970, 1971 (2)

See also
 Men's high jump Italian record progression

References

External links
 

1948 births
Italian male high jumpers
Italian athletics coaches
Living people
European Athletics Championships medalists
Universiade medalists in athletics (track and field)
Universiade silver medalists for Italy
Medalists at the 1970 Summer Universiade